Kalo Chita (The Black Leopard) is a Bengali adventure drama film directed by Satarupa Sanyal and produced by Palchaudhury movies, based on a story Kalochitar Photograph of Samaresh Majumdar. This film was released on 10 December 2004 under the banner of SCUD Production Company.

Plot
Pradip Gurung is a fearless young man. He needs 4 lakhs rupees to save an orphanage. He makes a deal with an industrialist Ramsundar Chhetri and goes to a risky mission to collect rare pictures of the meeting of Kalo Chita (black leopard) in Darjeeling-Gangtok border area. Paradip meets Sujata, a young lady who leaves her house after quarreling with her elder sister. The duos go for the adventure and subsequently involve with series of mysterious incidents.

Cast
 Rituparna Sengupta as Sujata
 Sharad Kapoor as Pradip Gurung
 Subhasish Mukhopadhyay
 Biswajit Chakraborty
 Monami Ghosh
 Joy Badlani
 Baisakhi Marjit
 Chandan Sen
 Arindam Ganguly

References

External links
 

2004 films
Bengali-language Indian films
Indian action adventure films
Films based on Indian novels
2000s adventure films
2004 drama films
Indian adventure drama films
2000s Bengali-language films